Ampedus pomorum is a species of click beetles native to Europe.

References

Elateridae
Beetles described in 1784
Beetles of Europe